The 1965–66 Iowa Hawkeyes men's basketball team represented the University of Iowa in intercollegiate basketball during the 1965–66 season. The team was led by Ralph Miller and played their home games at the Iowa Field House. The Hawkeyes finished the season 17–7 and were 8-6 in Big Ten conference games.

Roster

Schedule/results

|-
!colspan=9 style=| Non-Conference Regular Season

|-
!colspan=9 style=| Big Ten Regular Season

Rankings

Team players in the 1966 NBA Draft

References

Iowa Hawkeyes men's basketball seasons
Iowa
Hawkeyes
Hawkeyes